Mfumuni is an administrative ward in Moshi District of Kilimanjaro Region in Tanzania. According to a 2012 census, the ward has a population of 4,750.

References

Wards of Moshi Urban District
Wards of Kilimanjaro Region